Yuxarı Aran (known as Komsomol until 1991) is a village and municipality in the Beylagan Rayon of Azerbaijan.  It has a population of 1,623.

References 

Populated places in Beylagan District